Confessions of a Brazilian Call Girl is a 2011 Brazilian drama film directed by Marcus Baldini, based on the novel The Scorpion's Sweet Venom: The Diary of a Brazilian Call Girl written by Raquel Pacheco; starring Deborah Secco (as Bruna Surfistinha) and Cássio Gabus Mendes, it was shot in Paulínia and São Paulo.

Plot
Raquel Pacheco is a teen girl, adopted by an upper-middle-class family, who rebelled at 17 years old and left her adoptive family and studies at a traditional college in São Paulo to become a prostitute, and later call girl. Shortly after starting work, she decided to write a blog about her experiences. Since some clients thought she looked like a surfer she adopted the name "Surfistinha", which means "little surfer girl". This blog became a sensation, and quickly became one of the most popular blogs in Brazil. Becoming famous, her life changed significantly. She went on to be interviewed on Brazilian talk shows similar to Oprah and David Letterman, all the while continuing her blog about her racy exploits. But soon afterwards the fame gets to her in the form of addiction to drugs, which makes her do almost anything for a hit.

Cast
 Deborah Secco as Bruna Surfistinha
 Cássio Gabus Mendes as Huldson
 Cristina Lago as Gabi
 Drica Moraes as Larissa
 Fabiula Nascimento as Janine
 Guta Ruiz as Carol
 Clarisse Abujamra as Celeste
 Luciano Chirolli as Otto
 Sérgio Guizé as Rodrigo
 Simone Iliescu as Yasmin
 Érika Puga as Mel
 Brenda Lígia as Kelly
 Gustavo Machado as Miguel
 Juliano Cazarré as Gustavo
 Rodrigo Dorado as Rominho
 Roberto Audio as Gian
 Plínio Soares as Publicitário
 Sidney Rodrigues as Tomás

Awards and nominations

References

External links
 

2011 films
2011 biographical drama films
2010s erotic drama films
Brazilian biographical drama films
Brazilian erotic drama films
Films about prostitution in Brazil
Films based on Brazilian novels
Films set in São Paulo
Films shot in Paulínia
Films shot in São Paulo
2010s Portuguese-language films